Gumti Kalan is a village located in Bathinda District in the Indian state of Punjab.

References 

Bathinda
Villages in Bathinda district